

Queen Noor of Jordan

National Honours
  : Grand Cordon with collar of the Order of al-Hussein bin Ali (5.6.1978)
  : Special Grand Cordon of the Supreme Order of the Renaissance (5.6.1978)

Foreign Honours
  : Grand Star of the Decoration of Honour for Services to the Republic of Austria (1978),
  : First Class of the Most Esteemed Royal Family Order of Brunei (DK, 1984)
  : Dame of the Order of the Elephant of Denmark (27.4.1998)
  : First Class of the Virtues (Nishan al-Kemal) (1989)
  : Dame Grand Cross of the Order of Merit of the Italian Republic (26.11.1983)
  : Dame Grand Cross the Order of Isabella the Catholic (22.3.1985)
  : Member of the Royal Order of the Seraphim (15.9.1989)
  : Dame Grand Cross The Order of Charles III (4.11.1994)
 Dame Grand Cross of the Venerable Order of Saint John (GCStJ, 16.6.1989)

Abdullah II of Jordan

National decorations 

 Grand Master of the Order of al-Hussein bin Ali
 Grand Master of the Supreme Order of the Renaissance
 Grand Master of the Order of the Star of Jordan
 Grand Master of the Order of Independence

Foreign decorations 
  : Grand Star of the Decoration of Honour for Services to the Republic of Austria (2001)
  : Collar of the Order of al-Khalifa of Bahrain (4.11.1999)
  : Grand Cordon of the Order of Leopold (18.5.2016)
  : Collar of the Order of the Crown Royal family of Brunei (DKMB, 13 May 2008)
  : Grand Cross Special Class of the Order of Merit of the Federal Republic (21.10.2002)
  : Knight Grand Cross (15.1.1987) with Grand Cordon (9.02.2001) of the Order of Merit of the Italian Republic
  : Grand Cross (11.1993) then Collar (30.11.1999) of the Order of the Chrysanthemum
  : Medal for the tenth anniversary of the capital Astana
  : Extraordinary Grade of the Order of Merit of Lebanon (14.9.1999)
  : Grand Conqueror 1st class (1.9.1999)
  : 
 Grand Cross of the Order of the Netherlands Lion
 Grand Cross of Order of the House of Orange (7.12.1994)
  : Knight Grand Cross with collar of the Royal Norwegian Order of St. Olav (4.4.2000)
  : Grand Cross of the Order of the White Eagle (26.9.1999)
  : Grand Collar of the Order of Prince Henry (5 March 2008)
  : Collar of the Order of the Star of Romania (20.12.2005)
  : Knight of Grand Order of Mugunghwa (4.12.1999)
  : 
 Grand Cross with Collar of the Order of Charles III (21.4.2006)
 Grand Cross with Collar of the Order of Isabel the Catholic (1999)
 Grand Cross of the Military Merit in white of Spain (15.9.1995)
  : Knight of the Royal Order of the Seraphim (7 October 2003)
  : Order of Merit, 1st class & Order of Prince Yaroslav the Wise, 1st class
  :
 Grand Cross of the Order of the Bath, military class (GCB, 6.11.2001)
 Grand Cross of the Order of St. Michael and St. George (GCMG, 12.5.1999)
 Honorary Knight Commander of the Royal Victorian Order (KCVO, 26.3.1984)

Queen Rania of Jordan

National decorations 
 Grand Cordon with collar of the Order of al-Hussein bin Ali (9.6.1999)

Foreign decorations 
  : 1st class of the Order of al-Khalifa (4.11.1999)
  : Grand cross of the Order of Leopold (18.5.2016)
  : First Class of the Most Esteemed Royal Family Order of Brunei (DK, 13.5.2008)
  : Grand Cross Special Class of the Order of Merit of the Federal Republic (21.10.2002)
  : Knight Grand Cross of the Order of Merit of the Italian Republic (19.10.2009)
  : Grand Cordon of the Order of the Precious Crown (30.11.1999)
  : Grand Cross of the Order of the Netherlands Lion
  : Grand Cross of the Order of St. Olav (4.4.2000)
  : Grand Cross with Collar of the Order of Charles III (21.4.2006)
  : Grand Cross of the Order of Isabella the Catholic (18.10.1999)
  : Member of the Royal Order of the Seraphim

Hussein, Crown Prince of Jordan

National Honours
  : Knight of the Order of the Star of Jordan

Princess Alia bint Hussein 
Daughter of Hussein of Jordan and Queen Dina of Jordan, half-sister of Abdullah II of Jordan

National Honours
  : Grand Cordon of the Order of the Star of Jordan
  : 1st class of Al-Hussein Decoration for Distinguished Contribution (5.2.2007)

Foreign Honours
  : Grand Cordon of the Order of the Precious Crown (10.3.1976)
  : Grand Cross of the Royal Norwegian Order of Merit (4.4.2000)
  : Grand Cross of the Order of Isabella the Catholic (11.11.1994)

Sayyid Mohammed Al-Saleh, Princess Alia's 2nd husband

Foreign Honours
  : Grand Cross of the Royal Norwegian Order of Merit (4.4.2000)
  : Grand Cross of the Order of Civil Merit (18.10.1999)

Prince Faisal bin Hussein, brother of Abdullah II of Jordan 
Son of Hussein of Jordan and Princess Muna of Jordan, full-blood brother of Abdullah II of Jordan

National Honours
 see ribbon bars on the illustration photo
  : Grand Cordon of the Order of al-Hussein bin Ali
  : Grand Cordon of the Supreme Order of the Renaissance
  : Special Grand Cordon of the Order of the Star of Jordan
  : Grand Cordon of the Order of Independence (Jordan)
  : Grand Cordon of the Hussein Order of Military Merit

Medals 
 Medals for Long Service, Administration & Technical Competence, Administrative & Leadership Competence, Training Competence, etc. ...

Foreign Honours
  : Grand Cross of the Order of Isabella the Catholic (26.5.2006) by King Juan Carlos of Spain

Princess Alia Tabbaa, his former wife

Foreign Honours
  : Grand Cross of the Order of Isabella the Catholic (26.5.2006) by King Juan Carlos of Spain

Princess Aisha bint Hussein 
Daughter of Hussein of Jordan and Princess Muna of Jordan, full-blood sister of Abdullah II of Jordan and twin sister of Princess Zein

National Honours
  : Grand Cordon of the Order of the Star of Jordan
  : Grand Cordon of the Order of Independence
  : Al-Hussein Order of Military Merit 4th class

Medals
 King Hussein Medal of Excellence
 Medals for Administrative & Leadership Competence and Administrative & Technical Competence

Foreign Honours
  : First Class of the Order of Merit of Brunei (PSLJ) (13.5.2008)
  : Grand Cordon of the Order of the Precious Crown (30.11.1999)

Princess Zein bint Hussein 
Daughter of Hussein of Jordan and Princess Muna of Jordan, full-blood sister of Abdullah II of Jordan and twin sister of Princess Aisha

National Honours
  : Grand Cordon of the Order of the Star of Jordan
  : Grand Cordon of the Order of Independence

Medals
 Medal for Administrative & Leadership Competence

Foreign Honours
  : First Class of the Order of Merit of Brunei (PSLJ) (13.5.2008)
  : Grand Cross of the Royal Norwegian Order of Merit (4.4.2000)

Sayyid Majdi Al-Saleh, Princess Zein's husband

Foreign Honours
  : Grand Cross of the Royal Norwegian Order of Merit (4.4.2000)

Princess Haya bint Hussein 
Daughter of Hussein of Jordan and Queen Alia of Jordan, half-sister of Abdullah II of Jordan

National Honours
  : Special Grand Cordon of the Supreme Order of the Renaissance (30.1.2006)
 : Recipient of the  Al-Hussein Medal of Excellence, 2nd Class

Foreign Honours
 : Officer of the Order of the Legion of honour

Prince Ali bin Hussein, brother of Abdullah II of Jordan 
Son of Hussein of Jordan and Queen Alia of Jordan, half-brother of Abdullah II of Jordan

Prince Ali holds the Al-Nahda decoration of the first degree as well as a number of foreign decorations including the French Légion d'honneur, and the Order of the Rising Sun of Japan.

National Honours 
  : Grand Cordon of the Order of al-Hussein bin Ali
  : Grand Cordon of the Supreme Order of the Renaissance
  : Grand Cordon of the Order of the Star of Jordan
  : Grand Cordon of the Order of Independence
  : Al Hussein Order of Military Merit 4th class

Medals 

 King Hussein Medal of Excellence 
 Medals for Administration & Technical Competence, Administrative & Leadership Competence, Training Competence, etc.

Foreign Honours 
  : Grand Cross of the Order of the Dannebrog (27.4.1998)
  : Légion d'honneur
  : Order of the Rising Sun
  : Grand Cross of the Royal Norwegian Order of Merit (4.4.2000)
  : Grand Cross of the Order of Isabella the Catholic (26.5.2006) by King Juan Carlos of Spain
  : Commander Grand Cross of the Order of the Polar Star(7.10.2003)
  : Knight Commander of the Royal Victorian Order

Princess Rym al-Ali, his wife

National Honours 
  : Grand Cordon of the Order of the Star of Jordan

Foreign Honours 
  : Knight of the National Order of the Legion of Honour

Prince Hamzah bin Hussein 
Son of Hussein of Jordan and Queen Noor of Jordan, half-brother of Abdullah II of Jordan

National Honours
  : Grand Cordon of the Supreme Order of the Renaissance (November 1995)
  : Grand Cordon of the Order of the Star of Jordan (November 1995)
  : Grand Cordon of the Order of Independence
  : 4th class of the Al-Hussein Order of Military Merit

Foreign Honours
  : UN Peacekeeping Medal (2001)
  : First class of the Order of Ahmad al-Fateh (8.1999)
  : Knight Grand Cross of the Order of Merit of the Italian Republic (14/02/2001)
  : Grand Cross of the Order of Orange-Nassau (30.10.2006)
  : Knight Grand Cross with collar of the Order of St. Olav

Princess Noor Hamzah, his former wife

National Honours
  : Grand Cordon of the Order of the Star of Jordan

Foreign Honours
  : Grand Cross of the Order of Orange-Nassau (30.10.2006)

Prince Hashim bin Hussein 
Son of Hussein of Jordan and Queen Noor of Jordan, half-brother of Abdullah II of Jordan

National Honours
  : Grand Cordon of the Order of the Star of Jordan
  : 1st class of the Al-Hussein Order of Military Merit

Medals 
 King Hussein Medal of Excellence (10.6.2000)
 Medals for Administrative & Leadership Competence and Administrative & Technical Competence

Prince Muhammad bin Talal, eldest younger brother of King Hussein of Jordan

National Honours
  : Grand Cordon of the Order of al-Hussein bin Ali with Collar
  : Special Grand Cordon of the Supreme Order of the Renaissance
  : Grand Cordon of the Order of the Star of Jordan
  : Grand Cordon of the Order of Independence (Jordan)

Medals
Long Service and Good Conduct Medal
King Hussein Silver Jubilee Medal-1977
1967–1971 Service Medal-1971

Foreign Honours
  : Grand Cross of the Order of the Dannebrog
  : Grand Cross of the Order of the Queen of Sheba
  : Grand Cross of the National Order of Merit
  : Grand Cross of the Order of Merit of the Republic (26.11.1983)
  : Grand Cordon of the Order of the Rising Sun (11.1978)
  : Grand Cordon of the Order of Muhammad
  : 1st class of the Order of Abdulaziz al Saud
  : Grand Cordon of the Order of the Brilliant Star of Taiwan
  : Knight Grand Cross of the Royal Victorian Order (GCVO, 26.3.1984)

Prince Talal bin Muhammad, elder son of Muhammad bin Talal

National Honours
  : Grand Cordon of the Order of the Star of Jordan
  : Grand Cordon of the Order of Independence (Jordan)

Foreign Honours
  : Knight Grand Cross of the Royal Norwegian Order of Merit (4.4.2000)
  : Knight Grand Cross of the Royal Order of Isabella the Catholic (2.12.1994)

Princess Ghida Talal, his wife

National Honours
  : Grand Cordon of the Order of the Star of Jordan
  : Grand Cordon of the Order of Independence (Jordan)

Foreign Honours
  : Dame Grand Cross of the Royal Norwegian Order of Merit (4.4.2000)
  : Dame Grand Cross of the Royal Order of Isabella the Catholic (2.12.1994)

Prince Ghazi bin Muhammad, younger son of Muhammad bin Talal

National Honours
  : Grand Cordon of the Supreme Order of the Renaissance (9.10.2003)
  : Grand Cordon of the Order of the Star of Jordan (13.11.1995)

Medals 
  : Al-Hussein Distinguished Service Medal 1st class (24.8.1999)
  : and Education Medal 1st class (5.10.2004)

Foreign Honours
 : 
 Grand Cross of the National Order of Merit (16.11.1999)
 Officer (10.3.1997), Commander (20.11.1997), Grand Officer (7.1.2000) of the National Order of the Legion of Honour
  : Grand Cordon of the Order of Muhammad (10.3.2000)
  : First Class the Civil Order of Oman (2003)
  : First Class the Order of Bahrain (2005)

Prince Hassan bin Talal, youngest brother of King Hussein of Jordan

National Honours
  : Order of al-Hussein bin Ali (20.3.1987)
  : Special Grand Cordon of the Supreme Order of the Renaissance
  : Grand Cordon of the Order of the Star of Jordan
  : Grand Cordon of the Order of Independence (Jordan)

Medals
King Hussein Silver Jubilee Medal (1977)
1967–1971 Service Medal-1971
 the Great Ramadan War (1973) Medal

Foreign Honours
  : Grand Decoration of Honour in Gold with Sash (1st Class), for his services to the Republic of Austria (15.10.2004)
  : Grand Cordon of the Order of the Nile
  : Grand Cordon of the Order of the Crown of Iran
  : Knight Grand Cross of the Order of Merit of the Italian Republic (26.11.1983)
  : Grand Cordon of the Order of the Chrysanthemum (6.1970)
  : Grand Cordon of the National Order of the Cedar of the Lebanon
  : Knight Grand Cross of the Order of Orange-Nassau
  : Grand Cross of the Order of St. Olav
  : 
 Knight of the Royal Order of the Seraphim???
 Commander Grand Cross of the Order of the Polar Star (8.9.1989)
  : Knight Grand Cross of the Royal Victorian Order (GCVO, 26.3.1984)

Princess Sarvath al-Hassan, Hassan's wife

National Honours
  : Special Grand Cordon of the Supreme Order of the Renaissance (al-Nahda) (8.1994)

Foreign Honours
  : The Order of the Precious Crown of Japan (04.1988)
  : Knight Grand Cross of the Order of Orange-Nassau
  : Hilal-i-Imtiaz award (Crescent of Excellence, 23.3.2002) -- Order of Honour 2nd class (Hilal-i-Imtiaz) 
  : Commander Grand Cross of the Order of the Polar Star

Princess Rahma bint Hassan, Hassan's elder daughter

National Honours
  : Grand Cordon of the Order of Independence (Jordan)

Foreign Honours
  : Grand Cross of the Order of Orange-Nassau (30.10.2006)

Mr. Ala'a Al Batayneh, her husband

National Honours
  : Grand Cordon of the Order of Independence (Jordan)

Foreign Honours
  : Grand Cross of the Order of Orange-Nassau (30.10.2006)

Princess Sumaya bint Hassan, Hassan's 2nd daughter 
X

Sayyid Nasser Judeh, Hassan's younger daughter Princess Badiya bint Hassan's husband 
  : Grand Cordon of the Order of Independence (Jordan)

Prince Rashid bin Hassan, Hassan's son

National Honours
  : Grand Cordon of the Al-Hussein Order of Military Merit (1996)

Medals
 Al-Hussein Military Medal 1st class (14.11.1996)
 Medals of Administrative & Leadership Competence, and Administrative and Technical Competence

Foreign Honours
  : Sitara-e-Eisaar award (Star of Sacrifice, 14.2.2007)

Princess Basma bint Talal, sister of King Hussein of Jordan

National Honours
  : Special Grand Cordon of the Supreme Order of the Renaissance (7.1994)

Foreign Honours
  : Grand Decoration of Honour in Gold with Sash for Services to the Republic of Austria
  : Most Esteemed Family Order Laila Utama of Negara Brunei Darussalam (DK, 22.7.2000)
  : Grand Cordon of the Order of the Precious Crown (10.3.1976)
  : Dame Grand Cross of the Order of Isabella the Catholic (21.10.1999)
  : Commander Grand Cross of the Order of the Polar Star (7.10.2003)
  : Knight Cross of the Royal Victorian Order (GCVO, 6.11.2001)

Colonel Timoor al-Daghistani, Princess Basma bint Talal's first husband

National Honours
  : Grand Cordon of the Order of the Star of Jordan

Foreign Honours
  : Knight Grand Cross of the Order of Isabella the Catholic (21.10.1999)
  : Knight Grand Cross of the Royal Victorian Order (GCVO, 6.11.2001)

Sayyid Walid al-Kurdi, Princess Basma bint Talal's second husband

Foreign Honours
  : Order of the Star of the State of Brunei 1st class (PSNB, 16.7.2002)
  : Knight Grand Cross of the Royal Victorian Order (GCVO, 6.11.2001)

References 

Jordanian monarchy
Orders, decorations, and medals of Jordan
Jordan